Rusthum Jodi is a 1980 Indian Kannada-language film directed by K. Vijayan and produced by N. V. Ramaswamy. The film stars Shankar Nag and Gayatri whilst Manjula, Shakti Prasad, Sundar Krishna Urs appeared in cameo roles. The film was scripted by M. D. Sundar, photographed by Ishan Arya and had musical score by G. K. Venkatesh.

Cast

 Shankar Nag 
 Gayatri
 Manjula
 Fighter Shetty
 Advani Lakshmi Devi
 Jayamalini
 Sundar Krishna Urs
 Mysore Lokesh
 Vinod Mulani
 Kunigal Nagabhushan
 Indira
 Pushpa

Soundtrack
The music of the film was composed by G. K. Venkatesh with lyrics penned by Chi. Udaya Shankar.

Track list

References

External links
 Rusthum Jodi at Gaana

1980 films
1980s Kannada-language films
Indian action films
Films scored by G. K. Venkatesh
Films directed by K. Vijayan
1980 action films